Kate Miriam Granger  (31 October 1981 – 23 July 2016) was an English geriatrician and campaigner for better patient care. In 2011 she was diagnosed with desmoplastic small-round-cell tumor (DSRCT), a type of sarcoma, and subsequently started the "#hellomynameis" campaign encouraging healthcare staff to introduce themselves to patients. Granger also raised over £250,000 for local cancer charity, the Yorkshire Cancer Centre Appeal (now Leeds Cancer Centre Charity).

Early life 

Originally from Huddersfield, West Yorkshire, Granger studied at the University of Edinburgh, obtaining a BSc in Pharmacology in 2002 and an MB ChB in 2005. After qualifying she returned to West Yorkshire to work, obtaining a position with the Mid Yorkshire Hospitals NHS Trust, at Pinderfields Hospital, Wakefield.

Illness
Granger first became ill when on holiday in California in July 2011 with her husband Chris Pointon. She was treated in the Emergency Room in Santa Cruz when her kidneys failed. She returned to Leeds and was given further tests. When told the diagnosis, she knew that DSRCT that had metastasized had "an utterly dismal prognosis". She was treated with P6 protocol chemotherapy and endured painful treatments which she described in detail in her blog "The Other Side and the Bright Side".

She described how the news that her condition was incurable was broken to her:

Granger was the subject the second ever Dying Matters Annual Lecture 2014, with a filmed conversation with Granger.

After her diagnosis, Granger continued her medical training and qualified as a consultant geriatrician. During the latter stages of her illness, she was treated at St Gemma's Hospice, Leeds. She died on 23 July 2016, aged 34.

Campaigns

#hellomynameis 

Granger started the #hellomynameis campaign in 2013, chiefly using Twitter, where by the time of her death, she had over 40,000 followers.  The campaign name was the Twitter hashtag #hellomynameis, which has received more than 1.5 billion Twitter impressions. It was intended to encourage healthcare staff to introduce themselves to patients, following her experiences that she discussed in her book The Other Side.

On 31 August 2015, the second anniversary of the campaign, she recalled:

Kate spoke at the NHS Confederation annual conference in 2014 on the campaign.

, the campaign has been endorsed by more than 400,000 doctors, nurses, therapists, receptionists and porters across over 90 organisations, including NHS Trusts across England, NHS Scotland, NHS Wales and the NHS in Northern Ireland. She had spoken passionately at many health conferences and her campaign is supported by the former Prime Minister David Cameron, Nicola Sturgeon, Health Secretary Jeremy Hunt, many celebrities, and a significant number of leaders in health organisations in the UK and overseas. The campaign continues each 23 July (the anniversary of her death) across the NHS. In 2020 Leeds Cares published videos from staff to celebrate Kate and continue to campaign to improve patient care.

Fundraising 
Granger donated proceeds from the sales of her two books, and sponsored events such as a tandem skydiving jump, to cancer research. In total she raised over £250,000 for the Yorkshire Cancer Centre.

Awards and honours
In February 2014, NHS England created the Kate Granger Awards for Compassionate Care. These annual awards are in honour of Granger to "recognise an individual, team or organisation that has made a positive difference to patient care". In 2017, the publicly voted for Yorkshire Choice Awards introduced the Kate Granger Award for Outstanding Achievement. Healthcare Information and Management Systems Society launched the European Kate Granger Awards for Compassionate Care in 2018. In 2019, The Leeds Teaching Hospitals NHS Trust gave an award in Kate's honour as part of their Leeds Hospital Heroes for making a positive difference on the patient experience.

In June 2014, Granger was elected as a Fellow of the Royal College of Physicians, the first doctor in training that the college had elected as a fellow, in recognition of her contribution to healthcare.

Granger was made a Member of the Most Excellent Order of the British Empire (MBE) in the 2015 New Year Honours for services to the NHS and improving care. Her award was presented to her at Buckingham Palace by the Prince of Wales, in June 2015. Also in 2015, she was made an honorary Doctor of Science by London South Bank University.

In 2016, Granger received a special achievement award from the BMJ, honouring her for her work on the "Hello, my name is" campaign.

References

Publications
 
 
Granger, Kate; Healthcare staff must properly introduce themselves to patients. BMJ 2013; 347 (Published 2 October 2013)

External links
 Kate Granger's blog
 #hellomynameis on Twitter
#hellomynameis Website
 Campbell M Remembering Kate Miriam Granger: 1981–2016 Maclean's 27 July 2016 
 Kapur N Name badges and job titles to keep Kate Granger's legacy alive BMJ 16 August 2016

1981 births
2016 deaths
21st-century English medical doctors
English health activists
British geriatricians
Women geriatricians
Members of the Order of the British Empire
Deaths from cancer in England
Alumni of the University of Edinburgh
Alumni of the University of Edinburgh Medical School
Charity fundraisers (people)
People from Huddersfield
Fellows of the Royal College of Physicians
Medical doctors from Yorkshire
20th-century philanthropists